Eight Thousand Li of Cloud and Moon is a Taiwanese television series based on the life of Yue Fei, a Song dynasty general widely regarded as a patriot and national hero in Chinese culture for his role in the Jurchen campaigns against the Song dynasty. The Chinese title of the series comes from a line in Man Jiang Hong, a patriotic poem commonly attributed to Yue Fei. The series was first aired on CTS in Taiwan from 21 November 1988 to 13 January 1989.

Cast

 Kenny Ho as Yue Fei
 Ivy Ling Po as Lady Yao, Yue Fei's mother
 Hsu Pei-jung as Li Wa, Yue Fei's wife
 Lu Yih-lung as Niu Gao
 Chang Chen-huan as Wang Gui
 Wen Hsing as Zhang Xian
 Li Ya-min as Yue Yun
 Lan Wen-ching as Wang Zuo
 Lu Fung as Zhou Tong
 Tu Yung-hsien as Yue Lin
 Tu Yung-hsun as Yue Lei
 Tsai Tung-lin as Yue Ting
 Shih Chi-hsiang as Yue Zhen
 Tu Yung-fung as Yinping
 Li Chia-hua as Anniang
 Jin Chao-chun as Qin Hui
 Fan Hung-hsuan as Emperor Gaozong of Song
 Lung Lung as Han Shizhong
 Fu Lei as Zong Ze
 Liu Hsiu-wen as Qin Hui's wife
 Chou Jui-fang as Liang Hongyu
 Li You-lin as Wan Siguo
 Chang Feng as Li Gang
 Mou Hsi-tsung as Lü Yihao
 Han Hsiang-chin as Consort Wei
 Cheng Shao-fung as Liu Yu
 Chiang Yang as Du Chong
 Yu Heng as Zhou Sanwei
 Chang Fu-chien as Wuzhu
 Wang Hsiang as Hamichi
 Hsu En-chia as Halitu
 Lung Hsuan as Dahan
 Pao Cheng-fang as Yelü Cheniang
 Chao Chiang as Langzhu
 Chen Fu-sheng as Wanyan Jinna
 Wang Tan as Dutina
 Hsieh Hsing as Yang Me
 Hsieh Shu-chun as Yang Ping
 Liu Lun as Liu Zhengshun
  as Yang Hua
 Wang Chun as Li Cheng
 Li Lung-yin as Jin Er

See also
 Media about Yue Fei
 The Patriot Yue Fei

1988 Taiwanese television series debuts
1989 Taiwanese television series endings
Television series set in the Southern Song
Television series set in the Jin dynasty (1115–1234)
Cultural depictions of Yue Fei
Asian wars in television
1980s Taiwanese television series